Escape from Hell (also known as Hell Prison, I'm Coming Your Way and Femmine infernali) is a 1980 thriller film distributed by Variety Distribution.

While not prosecuted for obscenity, the film (titled Hell Prison) was seized and confiscated in the UK under Section 3 of the Obscene Publications Act 1959 during the video nasty panic.

Plot
A group of abused, scantily-clad female prisoners devise a plan to rebel against their oppressors and escape from their penitentiary.

Cast 
Anthony Steffen - Doctor Farrell
Ajita Wilson - Zaira
Cristina Lay - Vivienne
Cintia Lodetti - Katie
Luciano Pigozzi - The Warden
Serafino Profumo - Martinez
Maite Nicote - Mary (credited as Maite Nicott)
Yael Forti - Marika
Zaira Zoccheddu - Lucy
Adelaide Cendra - Female inmate 1
Angela Martinelli - Female inmate 2
Gilberto Galimberti - Luis
Anna Maria Panaro - Marie Antoinette, the madwoman
Robert Spafford - Martinez (voice) (uncredited)

Censorship in Britain
When submitted for cinema release in Britain in December 1980 under the title Escape From Hell the BBFC refused it a certificate. The following year a heavily edited version, retitled I'm Coming Your Way and running 66 minutes, was passed without further cuts. It was later submitted for VHS in 1988, now retitled Hell Prison and in its complete form, and received 3 mins 46 secs of cuts to scenes of sexual violence.

External links

Escape from Hell at Variety Distribution

1980 films
Italian independent films
Troma Entertainment films
Women in prison films
Films directed by Edoardo Mulargia
Films scored by Marcello Giombini
Italian erotic thriller films
1980 independent films
1980s Italian-language films
1980s Italian films